Dybowski (feminine: Dybowska; plural: Dybowscy) is a Polish surname. Notable people with this surname include:

 Benedykt Dybowski (1833–1930), Polish naturalist and physician
 Jean Dybowski (1856–1928), French agronomist and explorer

See also
 

Polish-language surnames